Törekvés Sportegyesület is a Hungarian football club from the town of Kőbánya, Budapest.

History
Törekvés debuted in the 1903 season of the Hungarian League and finished third.

Name Changes

1900–1951: Törekvés SC
1951–1955: Kőbányai Lokomotív
1955–1957: Kőbányai Törekvés
1957–1958: Haladás
1958–1995: Törekvés SE
1995–2000: Törekvés Szent István SE
2000–2001: Törekvés KISE
2001–2002: Grund R. Törekvés

External links
 Profil

References

Football clubs in Hungary
Defunct football clubs in Hungary
1900 establishments in Hungary